The Waters Meeting Nature Reserve is a forest nature reserve near Bathurst in the Eastern Cape, South Africa. The Kowie River borders the western edge of the reserve and separates it in the lower section with the Buffalo Kloof Protected Environment. The lower section contains the Sarel Hayward Dam.

History 
The reserve was designated in 1985 for the conservation of the region's flora and fauna.

See also 

 List of protected areas of South Africa

References 

Nature reserves in South Africa
Eastern Cape Provincial Parks